Molophilus is a very large genus of crane fly in the family Limoniidae.

Species
Subgenus Austromolophilus Theischinger, 1988

M. acutistylus Alexander, 1929
M. aplectus Alexander, 1929
M. asthenes Theischinger, 1992
M. benesignatus Theischinger, 1988
M. binyana Theischinger, 1992
M. burraganee Theischinger, 1992
M. cassisi Theischinger, 1988
M. chrysopterus Alexander, 1930
M. commoni Theischinger, 1988
M. coraperena Theischinger, 1992
M. cranstoni Theischinger, 1992
M. declinatus Theischinger, 1999
M. denise Theischinger, 1988
M. dindi Theischinger, 1992
M. diversistylus Alexander, 1927
M. echidna Theischinger, 1992
M. eugonius Alexander, 1927
M. expansistylus Alexander, 1929
M. exquisitus Alexander, 1929
M. flexilis Alexander, 1927
M. fragillimus Theischinger, 1988
M. gracillimus Alexander, 1927
M. gurara Theischinger, 2000
M. gweeon Theischinger, 1992
M. heroni Alexander, 1929
M. illperippa Theischinger, 1992
M. incomptus Alexander, 1927
M. kirra Theischinger, 1992
M. kitchingi Theischinger, 1994
M. koorang Theischinger, 1992
M. kulai Theischinger, 1994
M. laoonana Theischinger, 1994
M. lea Theischinger, 1992
M. lewisianus Theischinger, 1996
M. loratus Alexander, 1929
M. mattfulleri Theischinger, 1992
M. mina Theischinger, 2000
M. ngernka Theischinger, 1994
M. nglaiye Theischinger, 1994
M. nini Theischinger, 2000
M. nurawordubununa Theischinger, 1992
M. palpera Theischinger, 1992
M. pervagatus Skuse, 1890
M. phyllis Alexander, 1930
M. picticeps Alexander, 1927
M. pictipes Alexander, 1927
M. pinta Theischinger, 1992
M. pulchripes Skuse, 1890
M. pusio Alexander, 1927
M. setuliferus Alexander, 1927
M. smithersi Theischinger, 2000
M. spetai Theischinger, 1994
M. subasper Alexander, 1931
M. subhastatus Alexander, 1931
M. tenuior Theischinger, 1992
M. tersus Alexander, 1931
M. trianguliferus Alexander, 1927
M. tugloensis Theischinger, 2000
M. uncinatus Theischinger, 1988
M. uptoni Theischinger, 1988
M. warriuka Theischinger, 1992
M. werrikimbe Theischinger, 2000
M. wieseri Theischinger, 1994
M. wilto Theischinger, 2000
M. yandala Theischinger, 1992

Subgenus Bistromolophilus Theischinger, 1999
M. dooraganensis Theischinger, 1999
Subgenus Diplomolophilus Theischinger, 1992
M. mongana Theischinger, 1992
M. yumbera Theischinger, 1992
Subgenus Eumolophilus Alexander, 1921
M. angustior Alexander, 1936
M. pennipes Alexander, 1921
M. sabethoides Edwards, 1927
M. thaumastopodus Alexander, 1913
Subgenus Lyriomolophilus Theischinger, 1988
M. alexanderorum Theischinger, 1992
M. barina Theischinger, 1988
M. bickeli Theischinger, 1992
M. buckenbowra Theischinger, 1988
M. collessi Theischinger, 1988
M. gingera Theischinger, 1988
M. keira Theischinger, 1988
M. leonardi Theischinger, 1992
M. lyratus Alexander, 1927
M. neboissi Theischinger, 1988
M. neolyratus Alexander, 1934
M. sublyratus Alexander, 1931
M. weringerong Theischinger, 1992
Subgenus Molophilus Curtis, 1833

M. abhorrens Theischinger, 1999
M. abitus Alexander, 1944
M. abortivus Alexander, 1927
M. abruptus Alexander, 1923
M. acanthostylus Alexander, 1969
M. acanthus Alexander, 1923
M. aciferus Alexander, 1927
M. acinacis Alexander, 1969
M. acis Alexander, 1969
M. aculobatus Alexander, 1969
M. acutissimus Theischinger, 1988
M. adamantinus Alexander, 1927
M. aditi Alexander, 1969
M. admetus Alexander, 1969
M. aduncus Stary, 1978
M. aenigmaticus Alexander, 1925
M. aequiramus Savchenko, 1982
M. aequistylus Alexander, 1927
M. affrictus Alexander, 1950
M. africanus Riedel, 1914
M. akama Theischinger, 1992
M. alatostylus Hynes, 1988
M. albiceps Edwards, 1926
M. albireo Alexander, 1932
M. albocostalis Alexander, 1928
M. albohalteratus Alexander, 1925
M. alexanderianus Nielsen, 1963
M. algol Alexander, 1954
M. alpicola Alexander, 1930
M. amiculus Alexander, 1927
M. amieuensis Hynes, 1993
M. amphacanthus Alexander, 1952
M. ampliatus Alexander, 1927
M. analis Alexander, 1923
M. anerastus Alexander, 1934
M. angustilamina Alexander, 1956
M. annexus Alexander, 1927
M. annulipes Skuse, 1890
M. antares Alexander, 1932
M. anthracinus Lackschewitz, 1940
M. antimenus Alexander, 1952
M. aphantus Alexander, 1927
M. apicidens Alexander, 1951
M. apicidentatus Alexander, 1955
M. apicispinulus Alexander, 1969
M. appendiculatus (Staeger, 1840)
M. appressospinus Alexander, 1952
M. appressus Alexander, 1929
M. apricus Alexander, 1927
M. arapahoensis Alexander, 1958
M. araucanus Alexander, 1929
M. araucoensis Alexander, 1981
M. arcanus Alexander, 1927
M. archboldeanus Alexander, 1961
M. arciferus Alexander, 1952
M. arcuarius Alexander, 1930
M. aricola Alexander, 1930
M. ariel Alexander, 1932
M. arisanus Alexander, 1923
M. arizonicus Alexander, 1946
M. armatissimus Bangerter, 1947
M. armatistylus Alexander, 1929
M. ascendens Alexander, 1945
M. aspersulus Alexander, 1962
M. assamensis Brunetti, 1912
M. ater (Meigen, 1804)
M. aterrimus Alexander, 1936
M. atnaterta Theischinger, 1992
M. atrostylus Savchenko, 1978
M. aucklandicus Alexander, 1923
M. auriculifer Theischinger, 1988
M. avidus Alexander, 1940
M. avitus Alexander, 1953
M. axillispinus Alexander, 1962
M. azuayensis Alexander, 1980
M. babanus Alexander, 1957
M. baezi Theowald, 1981
M. banahaoensis Alexander, 1931
M. banias Stary & Freidberg, 2007
M. banksianus Alexander, 1922
M. bardus Alexander, 1934
M. barretti Alexander, 1929
M. basispina Alexander, 1923
M. basispinosus Alexander, 1981
M. bawbawiensis Alexander, 1931
M. bellicosus Alexander, 1929
M. bellona Alexander, 1946
M. belone Alexander, 1961
M. berberus Theischinger, 1994
M. beri Theischinger, 1992
M. berigora Theischinger, 1994
M. biaga Theischinger, 1992
M. bibaculus Alexander, 1979
M. bicaudatus Alexander, 1929
M. bicolor de Meijere, 1911
M. bidens Alexander, 1923
M. bidigitatus Alexander, 1931
M. bidigitifer Savchenko, 1976
M. bierigi Alexander, 1947
M. bifalcatus Alexander, 1925
M. bifidus Goetghebuer, 1920
M. bifilamentosus Alexander, 1948
M. bihamatus de Meijere, 1918
M. bilyarra Theischinger, 1992
M. binarius Alexander, 1968
M. binnaburra Theischinger, 1988
M. bipenniger Alexander, 1969
M. bipugiatus Alexander, 1969
M. bischofi Lackschewitz, 1940
M. bispinosus Alexander, 1919
M. bogongensis Alexander, 1929
M. boki Alexander, 1974
M. brachythrix Alexander, 1969
M. brasseanus Alexander, 1962
M. brevihamatus Bangerter, 1947
M. brevilobatus Alexander, 1939
M. brevinervis Alexander, 1923
M. breviramus Alexander, 1929
M. brevisectus Alexander, 1971
M. brevispinosus Alexander, 1929
M. brownianus Alexander, 1945
M. bruchi Alexander, 1923
M. bubbera Theischinger, 1992
M. bucerus Alexander, 1927
M. bunyipensis Alexander, 1931
M. cadmus Alexander, 1969
M. caenosus Alexander, 1937
M. calceatus Alexander, 1929
M. camerounensis Alexander, 1920
M. campbellianus Alexander, 1924
M. canopus Alexander, 1952
M. capitatus Alexander, 1927
M. capricornis Alexander, 1916
M. carpishensis Alexander, 1949
M. carstensis Stary, 1971
M. catamarcensis Alexander, 1921
M. cautus Alexander, 1947
M. celaenoleucus Alexander, 1961
M. celebesicus Alexander, 1935
M. cerberus Alexander, 1927
M. cervus Alexander, 1929
M. chazeaui Hynes, 1993
M. chiriquiensis Alexander, 1934
M. chleuastes Alexander, 1961
M. chloris Alexander, 1930
M. christine Theischinger, 1988
M. cinereifrons de Meijere, 1920
M. cingulipes Alexander, 1927
M. cladocerus Alexander, 1921
M. claessoni Mendl, 1986
M. clavigerus Alexander, 1929
M. clavistylus Mendl, 1979
M. colobicus Alexander, 1969
M. colonus Bergroth, 1888
M. colossus Alexander, 1929
M. compactus Alexander, 1950
M. concussus Alexander, 1936
M. congregatus Alexander, 1931
M. conscriptus Alexander, 1938
M. copelatus Alexander, 1969
M. coramba Theischinger, 1994
M. corniger de Meijere, 1920
M. coronarius Alexander, 1952
M. coryne Alexander, 1976
M. costalis Edwards, 1916
M. costopunctatus Dietz, 1921
M. cramptoni Alexander, 1924
M. crassipygus de Meijere, 1918
M. crassistylus Alexander, 1952
M. crassulus Alexander, 1934
M. creon Alexander, 1969
M. crimensis Savchenko, 1976
M. cristiferus Alexander, 1950
M. crististylus Alexander, 1969
M. cruciferus Alexander, 1922
M. ctenistes Alexander, 1961
M. ctenophorus Alexander, 1979
M. curtivena Alexander, 1925
M. curvatus Tonnoir, 1920
M. curvistylus Alexander, 1925
M. cyatheticolus Alexander, 1950
M. cygnus Alexander, 1932
M. czizeki Lackschewitz, 1931
M. daimio Alexander, 1953
M. dalby Theischinger, 1994
M. danielsi Theischinger, 1988
M. debilior Alexander, 1943
M. debilistylus Alexander, 1937
M. defoeanus Alexander, 1952
M. denticulatus Alexander, 1923
M. diacaenus Alexander, 1976
M. diacanthus Alexander, 1971
M. diacanthus Alexander, 1979
M. diceros Alexander, 1944
M. dicranostylus Alexander, 1961
M. dido Alexander, 1943
M. diferox Alexander, 1958
M. difficilis Alexander, 1927
M. dilatibasis Alexander, 1956
M. dilatus Alexander, 1951
M. diplolophus Alexander, 1969
M. directidens Stary, 1976
M. dirhabdus Alexander, 1949
M. dirus Alexander, 1943
M. dischidius Alexander, 1969
M. distifurcus Alexander, 1952
M. distinctissimus Alexander, 1931
M. distiremus Alexander, 1971
M. diversilobus Alexander, 1960
M. dizygus Alexander, 1962
M. dobrotworskyi Theischinger, 1992
M. dorriganus Alexander, 1934
M. dorsolobatus Theischinger, 1988
M. dravidianus Alexander, 1969
M. drepanostylus Alexander, 1934
M. drepanucha Alexander, 1929
M. duckhousei Theischinger, 1992
M. ductilis Alexander, 1938
M. duplex Alexander, 1927
M. duplicatus Alexander, 1940
M. eboracensis Alexander, 1944
M. echo Alexander, 1952
M. editus Alexander, 1928
M. efferox Alexander, 1947
M. electus Alexander, 1927
M. emarginatus Alexander, 1937
M. ephippiger Alexander, 1934
M. erebus Alexander, 1927
M. erectus Alexander, 1953
M. ermolenkoi Savchenko, 1976
M. errabunga Theischinger, 1992
M. erricha Theischinger, 1992
M. errinundra Theischinger, 1999
M. erugatus Alexander, 1960
M. ethicus Alexander, 1962
M. eumonostylus Alexander, 1952
M. eurygramma Alexander, 1929
M. exeches Alexander, 1965
M. exemptus Alexander, 1953
M. exiguus Alexander, 1927
M. expansus Alexander, 1927
M. exsertus Alexander, 1927
M. extensicornis Alexander, 1934
M. extensilobus Alexander, 1960
M. extricatus Alexander, 1930
M. facinus Alexander, 1940
M. fagetorum Alexander, 1929
M. falcatus Bergroth, 1888
M. falculus Alexander, 1957
M. falx Alexander, 1938
M. femoratus Skuse, 1890
M. fenderi Alexander, 1952
M. fergusonianus Alexander, 1927
M. ferox Alexander, 1931
M. filiolus Alexander, 1952
M. filistylus Alexander, 1927
M. filius Alexander, 1952
M. flagellatus Stary, 1976
M. flagellifer Alexander, 1922
M. flavexemptus Alexander, 1968
M. flavidellus Alexander, 1930
M. flavidulus Alexander, 1923
M. flavidus Alexander, 1914
M. flavoannulatus Alexander, 1927
M. flavocingulatus Alexander, 1928
M. flavomarginalis Alexander, 1923
M. flavonotatus Skuse, 1890
M. flavotibialis Alexander, 1969
M. flavus Goetghebuer, 1920
M. flemingi Alexander, 1950
M. flexilistylus Alexander, 1931
M. flexostylus Hynes, 1988
M. flinti Alexander, 1967
M. floridensis Alexander, 1925
M. fluviatilis Bangerter, 1947
M. forceps Alexander, 1927
M. forcipulus (Osten Sacken, 1869)
M. fortidens Alexander, 1951
M. franzi Caspers, 1980
M. frohnei Alexander, 1968
M. fultonensis Alexander, 1916
M. furciferus Alexander, 1965
M. furcophallus Hynes, 1988
M. furcus Alexander, 1951
M. furiosus Alexander, 1938
M. furvus Alexander, 1927
M. fuscopleuralis Alexander, 1927
M. fusiformis Alexander, 1934
M. fustiferus Alexander, 1961
M. gargantua Alexander, 1941
M. gemellus Alexander, 1927
M. genitalis (Brunetti, 1912)
M. gilvus Alexander, 1927
M. gladiator Alexander, 1939
M. gomesi Alexander, 1942
M. gracilipes Alexander, 1959
M. gracilis Skuse, 1890
M. grampianus Alexander, 1930
M. gravis Alexander, 1956
M. gressittianus Alexander, 1961
M. griseatus Edwards, 1933
M. griseus (Meigen, 1804)
M. grus Alexander, 1941
M. guatemalensis Alexander, 1913
M. gubara Theischinger, 1994
M. gununo Theischinger, 1992
M. gurkha Alexander, 1959
M. gymnocladus Alexander, 1928
M. haagi Alexander, 1946
M. habbemae Alexander, 1961
M. hardyi Alexander, 1973
M. harrisianus Alexander, 1925
M. harrisoni Alexander, 1945
M. hecate Alexander, 1971
M. heliscus Alexander, 1969
M. heteracanthus Alexander, 1925
M. heterocerus Dietz, 1921
M. hexacanthus Alexander, 1924
M. hilaris Alexander, 1923
M. hirsuticlavus Alexander, 1980
M. hirtipennis (Osten Sacken, 1860)
M. hispidulus Alexander, 1932
M. hollowayi Theischinger, 1988
M. honestus Alexander, 1923
M. hoplostylus Alexander, 1950
M. horakae Theischinger, 1994
M. horridus Alexander, 1927
M. howensis Theischinger, 1994
M. howesi Alexander, 1923
M. huron Alexander, 1929
M. hylandensis Theischinger, 1999
M. hyperarmatus Alexander, 1940
M. hypipame Theischinger, 1996
M. hyrcanus Savchenko, 1978
M. hystrix Alexander, 1939
M. ictus Alexander, 1969
M. idiophallus Alexander, 1956
M. idiostylus Alexander, 1969
M. illectus Alexander, 1941
M. iluka Theischinger, 1992
M. imberbis Alexander, 1923
M. immutatus Alexander, 1929
M. improcerus Alexander, 1939
M. inaequidens Alexander, 1927
M. inarmatus Alexander, 1940
M. incognitus Alexander, 1946
M. inconspicuus Brunetti, 1912
M. incurvus Mendl, 1979
M. indivisus Alexander, 1927
M. indurabilis Alexander, 1967
M. infantulus Edwards, 1923
M. inflexibilis Alexander, 1929
M. inimicus Alexander, 1935
M. injustus Alexander, 1937
M. inornatus Edwards, 1923
M. insanus Alexander, 1970
M. insertus Theischinger, 1992
M. intactus Alexander, 1961
M. integristylus Alexander, 1945
M. inusitatus Alexander, 1979
M. invidus Alexander, 1951
M. irregularis Alexander, 1923
M. ishizuchianus Alexander, 1954
M. isolatus Alexander, 1952
M. issikii Alexander, 1928
M. itoanus Alexander, 1953
M. ixine Alexander, 1961
M. iyoanus Alexander, 1953
M. iyouta Theischinger, 1994
M. janus Alexander, 1930
M. japetus Alexander, 1969
M. javensis Edwards, 1927
M. jenseni Alexander, 1924
M. kaandha Theischinger, 1992
M. kallemuelleri Mendl, 1984
M. kama Theischinger, 1992
M. karaka Theischinger, 1992
M. karta Theischinger, 1992
M. keda Theischinger, 1992
M. khasicus Alexander, 1936
M. kinabaluanus Edwards, 1933
M. kiushiuensis Alexander, 1941
M. klementi Mendl, 1973
M. kokodanus Alexander, 1948
M. kokora Theischinger, 1992
M. kotenkoi Savchenko, 1986
M. kuborensis Hynes, 1988
M. kulshanicus Alexander, 1949
M. kuniekoondie Theischinger, 1992
M. kutha Theischinger, 1992
M. lackschewitzianus Alexander, 1953
M. laevistylus Alexander, 1944
M. laius Alexander, 1969
M. lanceolatus Stary, 1971
M. lancifer Alexander, 1953
M. lanei Alexander, 1945
M. laricicola Alexander, 1929
M. laterospinosus Alexander, 1929
M. latibasis Alexander, 1956
M. latipennis Alexander, 1923
M. lauri Alexander, 1945
M. lautereri Stary, 1974
M. laxus Alexander, 1950
M. leonurus Alexander, 1951
M. lepcha Alexander, 1959
M. lerionis Alexander, 1945
M. lethaeus Alexander, 1952
M. lewis Theischinger, 1994
M. lictor Alexander, 1938
M. lieftincki Alexander, 1961
M. lindsayi lindsayi Alexander, 1922
M. lindsayi oliveri Alexander, 1922
M. lobiferus Alexander, 1925
M. longiclavus Alexander, 1924
M. longicornis Skuse, 1890
M. longifurcatus Theischinger, 1988
M. longioricornis Alexander, 1921
M. longistylus Savchenko, 1976
M. lucidipennis Skuse, 1890
M. lupus Alexander, 1954
M. luteipennis Alexander, 1923
M. luteipygus Alexander, 1922
M. luxuriosus Alexander, 1938
M. macalpinei Theischinger, 1988
M. mackerrasi Alexander, 1927
M. macleayanus Alexander, 1928
M. macquillani Theischinger, 1994
M. macracanthus Savchenko, 1983
M. macrocerus Alexander, 1922
M. macrophallus Alexander, 1925
M. macrothrix Alexander, 1969
M. magellanicus Alexander, 1968
M. maigamaigawa Theischinger, 1992
M. malayensis Edwards, 1928
M. mancus Alexander, 1944
M. manjimupensis Theischinger, 1988
M. margarita Alexander, 1979
M. maroondah Theischinger, 1992
M. marthae Alexander, 1931
M. masafuerae Alexander, 1952
M. mattina Theischinger, 1992
M. maurus Lackschewitz, 1925
M. mawiliri Theischinger, 1992
M. medius de Meijere, 1918
M. megacanthus Alexander, 1934
M. melanakon Alexander, 1969
M. melanoleucus Alexander, 1953
M. memnon Alexander, 1971
M. mendicus Alexander, 1931
M. metpadinga Theischinger, 1992
M. metuendus Alexander, 1951
M. micracanthus Alexander, 1927
M. microserratus Alexander, 1980
M. militaris Alexander, 1931
M. mimicus Alexander, 1929
M. ministylus Theischinger, 1999
M. miraculus Alexander, 1938
M. mirla Theischinger, 1992
M. mjobergi Alexander, 1927
M. momus Alexander, 1969
M. monacanthus Alexander, 1940
M. monoctenus Alexander, 1951
M. monostyloides Alexander, 1951
M. monostylus Alexander, 1928
M. monstrosus Mendl, 1974
M. montanus Mendl, 1973
M. monteithi Theischinger, 1994
M. morosus Alexander, 1923
M. morulus Alexander, 1929
M. mouensis Hynes, 1993
M. mouldsi Theischinger, 1988
M. muggil Theischinger, 1994
M. multicinctus Edwards, 1923
M. multicurvatus Theischinger, 1988
M. multifidus Alexander, 1952
M. multilobatus Savchenko, 1976
M. multispicatus Alexander, 1978
M. multispinosus Alexander, 1923
M. murudanus Edwards, 1926
M. myersi Alexander, 1925
M. nahuelbutae Alexander, 1967
M. nakamurai Alexander, 1933
M. nannopterus Alexander, 1956
M. natalicolus Alexander, 1958
M. neanerastus Alexander, 1969
M. neecoo Theischinger, 1994
M. neodiceros Alexander, 1967
M. neofacinus Alexander, 1964
M. neopansus Alexander, 1971
M. neosubfalcatus Alexander, 1980
M. neovaruna Alexander, 1973
M. neptunus Alexander, 1952
M. nerriga Theischinger, 1992
M. nesioticus Alexander, 1953
M. nielseni Theischinger, 1994
M. niger Goetghebuer, 1920
M. nigrescens Lackschewitz, 1940
M. nigripes Edwards, 1921
M. nigritarsis Alexander, 1930
M. nigritus Alexander, 1930
M. nilgiricus Edwards, 1927
M. niveicinctus Alexander, 1922
M. nocticolor Alexander, 1953
M. nodicornis Lackschewitz, 1935
M. nodulifer Savchenko, 1978
M. nokonis Alexander, 1928
M. norrisi Theischinger, 1994
M. novacaesariensis Alexander, 1916
M. nubleanus Alexander, 1979
M. obediens Alexander, 1927
M. obliteratus Alexander, 1931
M. obliviosus Alexander, 1953
M. obscurus (Meigen, 1818)
M. obsoletus Lackschewitz, 1940
M. obtusilobus Alexander, 1969
M. occidentalis Theischinger, 1988
M. occultus de Meijere, 1918
M. ochraceus (Meigen, 1818)
M. ohakunensis Alexander, 1923
M. okadai Alexander, 1936
M. oldenbergi Lackschewitz, 1935
M. oligacanthus Alexander, 1958
M. oligotrichus Alexander, 1954
M. oppositus Alexander, 1923
M. opulus Alexander, 1929
M. orcus Alexander, 1970
M. ordinarius Alexander, 1948
M. oregonicolus Alexander, 1947
M. orion Alexander, 1914
M. ornatipes Alexander, 1969
M. ornithostylus Alexander, 1981
M. orumbera Theischinger, 1994
M. othello Alexander, 1941
M. ozotus Alexander, 1968
M. pacifer Alexander, 1947
M. padmuri Theischinger, 1992
M. paganus Alexander, 1942
M. pala Alexander, 1941
M. pallatangensis Alexander, 1929
M. pallidibasis Alexander, 1928
M. pallidipes Alexander, 1975
M. pallidulus Alexander, 1925
M. pallidus (Philippi, 1866)
M. palomaricus Alexander, 1947
M. palpifer Savchenko, 1976
M. paludicola Alexander, 1929
M. panchrestus Alexander, 1941
M. pansus Alexander, 1968
M. paradiceros Alexander, 1967
M. paraguayanus Alexander, 1929
M. parannulipes Theischinger, 1992
M. paratetrodonta Theischinger, 1992
M. parerebus Theischinger, 1992
M. parvati Alexander, 1969
M. parviclavus Alexander, 1979
M. parviserratus Alexander, 1934
M. parvispiculus Alexander, 1976
M. parvistylus Alexander, 1927
M. parvulus Alexander, 1922
M. pastoris Alexander, 1960
M. paucispinosus Alexander, 1925
M. paucispinus Alexander, 1957
M. paulus Bergroth, 1888
M. pauper Savchenko, 1978
M. pauperculus Alexander, 1929
M. pectinatus Alexander, 1928
M. pectiniferus Alexander, 1952
M. peculiaris Alexander, 1973
M. pediformis Alexander, 1925
M. pegasus Alexander, 1913
M. penai Alexander, 1951
M. pengana Theischinger, 1992
M. penicillatus Alexander, 1941
M. pennatus Alexander, 1927
M. perattenuatus Alexander, 1969
M. perdebilis Alexander, 1943
M. perdistinctus Alexander, 1927
M. perextensus Alexander, 1951
M. perferox Alexander, 1957
M. perfidus Alexander, 1929
M. perflaveolus Alexander, 1918
M. pergracillimus Alexander, 1971
M. perhirtipes Alexander, 1961
M. perlucidus Alexander, 1950
M. perluteolus Alexander, 1930
M. permutatus Alexander, 1931
M. perpendicularis Alexander, 1944
M. perproductus Alexander, 1948
M. perserenus Alexander, 1978
M. perseus Alexander, 1913
M. persimilis Alexander, 1927
M. persinuosus Alexander, 1941
M. pertenuis Alexander, 1953
M. phallacanthus Alexander, 1950
M. phallodontus Alexander, 1968
M. phallosomicus Alexander, 1939
M. philpotti Alexander, 1922
M. pictifemoratus Alexander, 1933
M. pictipleura Alexander, 1922
M. pictitibia Alexander, 1969
M. pictor Alexander, 1934
M. picturatus Alexander, 1923
M. pieltaini Edwards, 1938
M. piger Alexander, 1942
M. pilosulus Edwards, 1924
M. pimelia Theischinger, 1988
M. pirioni Alexander, 1929
M. pita Theischinger, 1992
M. plagiatus Alexander, 1922
M. planitas Alexander, 1953
M. platyphallus Alexander, 1942
M. plebejus Alexander, 1956
M. pleuralis de Meijere, 1920
M. pleurolineatus Stary, 1971
M. plumbeiceps Alexander, 1927
M. poecilonotus Alexander, 1924
M. poliocephalus Alexander, 1927
M. politonigrus Savchenko, 1983
M. pollex Alexander, 1931
M. polycanthus Alexander, 1936
M. polychaeta Alexander, 1979
M. ponticus Savchenko, 1982
M. porrectus Alexander, 1925
M. praelatus Alexander, 1927
M. pretiosus Alexander, 1929
M. priapoides Stary, 1971
M. priapus Lackschewitz, 1935
M. procax Alexander, 1946
M. procericornis Alexander, 1931
M. profligatus Alexander, 1961
M. prolatus Alexander, 1961
M. promeces Alexander, 1961
M. propinquus (Egger, 1863)
M. protervus Alexander, 1961
M. proximus Mendl, 1979
M. psephenus Alexander, 1978
M. pseudopropinquus Mendl, 1973
M. pubipennis (Osten Sacken, 1860)
M. pugiunculus Alexander, 1969
M. pugnax Alexander, 1925
M. pulcherrimus Edwards, 1923
M. pullatus Alexander, 1924
M. pullus Lackschewitz, 1927
M. pulvinus Alexander, 1943
M. pusillus Edwards, 1921
M. pustulatus Alexander, 1946
M. puthawing Theischinger, 1994
M. quadrifidus Alexander, 1922
M. quadrispinosus Alexander, 1924
M. quadristylus Alexander, 1922
M. quinquespinosus Alexander, 1952
M. rachius Alexander, 1958
M. rainieriensis Alexander, 1943
M. raptor Alexander, 1947
M. rasilis Alexander, 1927
M. recisus Alexander, 1924
M. rectispinus Alexander, 1952
M. reductissimus Alexander, 1956
M. reductus Alexander, 1927
M. reduncus Alexander, 1925
M. remiger Alexander, 1922
M. remotus Alexander, 1923
M. remulsus Alexander, 1932
M. repandus Alexander, 1923
M. repentinus Stary, 1971
M. retrorsus Alexander, 1939
M. rhamphus Alexander, 1979
M. riawunna Theischinger, 1992
M. richardsi Alexander, 1929
M. rostriferus Alexander, 1943
M. rubidithorax Alexander, 1929
M. ruficollis Skuse, 1890
M. sackenianus Alexander, 1926
M. sagax Alexander, 1938
M. sagittarius Alexander, 1914
M. sarotes Alexander, 1969
M. satyr Alexander, 1925
M. savtshenkoi Stary, 1972
M. scaber Alexander, 1927
M. scabricornis Alexander, 1942
M. schultzei Alexander, 1946
M. scotoneurus Alexander, 1960
M. scutellatus Goetghebuer, 1929
M. secundus Alexander, 1923
M. selkirkianus (Enderlein, 1938)
M. sepositus Alexander, 1923
M. sequoiae Alexander, 1952
M. sericatus Alexander, 1924
M. serpentarius Alexander, 1962
M. serpentiger Edwards, 1938
M. serratus Savchenko, 1976
M. serrulatus Alexander, 1929
M. setilobatus Alexander, 1979
M. setistylatus Alexander, 1980
M. setosistylus Alexander, 1952
M. severus Alexander, 1925
M. shannoninus Alexander, 1947
M. sherpa Alexander, 1959
M. sicarius Alexander, 1929
M. sigma Alexander, 1927
M. sinclairi Theischinger, 1996
M. soror Alexander, 1927
M. sparsispinus Alexander, 1952
M. sparus Alexander, 1940
M. speighti Alexander, 1939
M. spiculatus Alexander, 1918
M. spiculistylatus Alexander, 1930
M. spiniapicalis Alexander, 1976
M. spinifer Lackschewitz, 1940
M. spinifex Alexander, 1952
M. spinilobatus Alexander, 1969
M. spinosissimus Alexander, 1956
M. spinulosus Alexander, 1979
M. sponsus Alexander, 1955
M. squamosus Alexander, 1919
M. stenacanthus Alexander, 1962
M. stenopterus Alexander, 1936
M. stenorhabdus Alexander, 1960
M. stewartensis Alexander, 1924
M. stolidus Alexander, 1948
M. strix Alexander, 1930
M. stroblianus Nielsen, 1953
M. stygius Alexander, 1980
M. stylifer Alexander, 1921
M. stylopappus Alexander, 1961
M. styx Alexander, 1952
M. suavis Alexander, 1927
M. subalpicola Alexander, 1931
M. subannulipes Alexander, 1978
M. subappressus Alexander, 1940
M. subbelone Hynes, 1988
M. subexemptus Alexander, 1968
M. subfalcatus Alexander, 1940
M. subgriseus Savchenko, 1976
M. subhonestus Alexander, 1971
M. subhorridus Alexander, 1931
M. subiratus Alexander, 1947
M. sublancifer Alexander, 1973
M. sublateralis Alexander, 1922
M. sublictor Alexander, 1939
M. submorosus Alexander, 1924
M. subochraceus Savchenko, 1976
M. subperfidus Alexander, 1980
M. subretrorsus Alexander, 1980
M. subsagax Alexander, 1939
M. subscaber Alexander, 1952
M. substylifer Alexander, 1929
M. subtenebricosus Alexander, 1931
M. subuliferus Alexander, 1925
M. subvinnulus Alexander, 1973
M. suffalcatus Alexander, 1947
M. sylvicolus Alexander, 1924
M. takaoensis Alexander, 1933
M. talamancensis Alexander, 1947
M. tantulus Alexander, 1969
M. tanypodus Alexander, 1969
M. tanypus Alexander, 1922
M. tartarus Alexander, 1948
M. tasioceroides Alexander, 1930
M. tateanus Alexander, 1962
M. taurus Alexander, 1914
M. tawagensis Alexander, 1931
M. taylorinus Alexander, 1936
M. tehuelche Alexander, 1968
M. telerhabdus Alexander, 1946
M. tenebricosus Alexander, 1916
M. tenuiclavus Alexander, 1927
M. tenuissimus Alexander, 1923
M. tenuistylus Alexander, 1923
M. tergospinosus Alexander, 1967
M. terminans Alexander, 1922
M. ternarius Alexander, 1929
M. ternatus Alexander, 1934
M. terrayi Stary, 1992
M. tetracanthus Alexander, 1929
M. tetragonus Alexander, 1934
M. tetrodonta Alexander, 1942
M. theresia Theischinger, 1994
M. thuckara Theischinger, 1994
M. thyellus Alexander, 1960
M. tillyardi Alexander, 1922
M. tirolensis Hancock, 2005
M. titan Alexander, 1928
M. titanius Alexander, 1930
M. tjederi Stary, 1968
M. tonnoiri Alexander, 1925
M. tortilis Alexander, 1927
M. toxopeanus Alexander, 1961
M. translucens Skuse, 1890
M. tricuspidatus Mendl, 1979
M. tridens Alexander, 1952
M. tridigitatus Alexander, 1947
M. triepiurus Alexander, 1961
M. trifibra Alexander, 1954
M. trifilatus Alexander, 1920
M. trigonalis Alexander, 1931
M. triparcus Alexander, 1944
M. tripectinatus Alexander, 1927
M. trispinosus Theischinger, 1992
M. tristylus Alexander, 1927
M. tseni Alexander, 1940
M. tucumanus Alexander, 1929
M. turritus Alexander, 1961
M. tuta Theischinger, 1992
M. tuu Theischinger, 1992
M. ugundyi Theischinger, 1994
M. ulbracullima Theischinger, 1992
M. umboiensis Hynes, 1988
M. undulatus Tonnoir, 1920
M. uniclavatus Alexander, 1938
M. uniformis (Blanchard, 1852)
M. uniguttatus Alexander, 1927
M. uniplagiatus Alexander, 1923
M. unispiculatus Alexander, 1959
M. unispinosus Alexander, 1921
M. unistylus Alexander, 1936
M. upjohni Theischinger, 1994
M. urodontus Savchenko, 1978
M. ursus Alexander, 1918
M. vafer Lackschewitz, 1940
M. vallisspei Theischinger, 1988
M. variatus Alexander, 1952
M. variegatus Edwards, 1923
M. variispinus Stary, 1971
M. variistylus Alexander, 1927
M. variitibia Alexander, 1956
M. varuna Alexander, 1969
M. veddah Alexander, 1958
M. velvetus Alexander, 1926
M. verecundus Alexander, 1924
M. vernalis Brunhes & Geiger, 1992
M. verticalis Alexander, 1927
M. vigilans Alexander, 1956
M. vinnulus Alexander, 1962
M. vividus Alexander, 1931
M. vorax Alexander, 1948
M. vulpinus Alexander, 1929
M. wadna Theischinger, 1992
M. walkeri Alexander, 1931
M. walpole Theischinger, 1988
M. warroo Theischinger, 1992
M. wataganensis Theischinger, 1999
M. waukatte Theischinger, 1992
M. wejaya Alexander, 1958
M. wellsae Theischinger, 1999
M. willara Theischinger, 1992
M. williamsi Theischinger, 1992
M. wilsoni Alexander, 1929
M. womba Theischinger, 1992
M. worraworra Theischinger, 1992
M. xanthus Alexander, 1955
M. yabbie Theischinger, 1992
M. yakkho Alexander, 1958
M. yoshimotoi Hynes, 1993
M. yunquensis Alexander, 1952
M. zenta Theischinger, 1988
M. zwickorum Theischinger, 1994

Subgenus Onychomolophilus Theischinger, 1992
M. equisetosus Alexander, 1934
M. gidya Theischinger, 1992
M. piggibilla Theischinger, 1992
Subgenus Promolophilus Alexander, 1966
M. afghanicus Alexander, 1969
M. albibasis Alexander, 1924
M. apollyon Alexander, 1955
M. avazhon Savchenko, 1976
M. avernus Alexander, 1969
M. bilobulus Alexander, 1938
M. brobdingnagius Alexander, 1969
M. diacus Alexander, 1969
M. dirhaphis Alexander, 1958
M. grishma Alexander, 1969
M. lethe Alexander, 1969
M. millardi Alexander, 1945
M. munkar Alexander, 1969
M. nestor Alexander, 1969
M. nigropolitus Alexander, 1935
M. nitidulus Alexander, 1946
M. nitidus Coquillett, 1905
M. subnitens Alexander, 1946
M. sudra Alexander, 1969
Subgenus Rhynchomolophilus Alexander, 1965
M. perrostratus Alexander, 1965
Subgenus Superbomolophilus Theischinger, 1988
M. brumby Theischinger, 1988
M. cooloola Theischinger, 1992
M. froggatti Skuse, 1890
M. gigas Alexander, 1922
M. inelegans Alexander, 1927
M. kunara Theischinger, 1992
M. marriwirra Theischinger, 1992
M. osterhas Theischinger, 1994
M. undia Theischinger, 1996
Subgenus Trichomolophilus Alexander, 1936
M. celator Alexander, 1942
M. multisetosus Alexander, 1936
M. tentator Alexander, 1947
Unplaced
M. micropteryx Alexander, 1927
M. subapterogyne Alexander, 1927

References

Limoniidae
Nematocera genera